The Pakistan Canoe and Kayak Federation (PCKF) is the official national governing body for canoeing and kayaking Olympic sports in Pakistan. Its function is to promote sporting activities and events for canoe and kayak paddlers across the country on a national and international level. PCKF is a non-profit organisation, which represents all people and organisations with a genuine interest in canoeing, kayaking and associated sports, helping them to increase the profile of these sports across Pakistan.

It was formed on 23 March 2009. Malik Abdul Rahim Babi is the current President.

Headquarters 
The headquarter of PCKF is based in Hayat Durrani Water Sports Academy (HDWSA) at Hanna Lake, Quetta, Balochistan, from where it carries out administration for all canoeing and kayaking across the country.

Affiliations 
On the international level, PCKF is affiliated with the International Canoe Federation. Within Asia, it is affiliated with the Asian Canoe Confederation (ACC). It has been recognised on a national level by the Federal Ministry of Sports as a member of the Pakistan Sports Board, as well as the Balochistan Sports Board (part of the Government of Balochistan) through its constituent unit BCA. In addition, it is affiliated with the Balochistan Olympic Association through the Balochistan Canoeing and Kayaking Association.

In the near future, PCKF intends to be affiliated with the Pakistan Olympic Association (POA), according to its own constitution as a non-profit sports organization in Pakistan. Mohammad Abubakar Durrani is Pakistan's National Champion in K,1-M 200M since 2007.

Affiliated associations 

The following bodies within Pakistan are affiliated with PCKF:

Provinces 
 Balochistan Canoeing and Kayak Association
 Islamabad Canoe Association
 Khyber Pakhtunkhwa Canoeing Association
 Punjab Amateur Canoeing Association
 Sindh Canoeing Association

Institutes 
 Hayat Durrani Water Sports Academy (HDWSA)
 Pakistan Customs Sports Board Quetta
 I.T University Balochistan
 Balochistan University
 Pearl IT and Degree College Quetta and London
 Girls College Quetta
 Girls College Jinnah Town Quetta
 Pakistan Canoe and Kayak Coaches Association
 Pakistan Canoeing Umpires and Judges Association

Departments 
 Pakistan Railways
 Water & Power Development Authority
 Pakistan Police
 Pakistan Navy

References 

National members of the Asian Canoe Confederation
Canoe and Kayak
Sports organizations established in 2009
2009 establishments in Pakistan
Organisations based in Quetta
Canoeing and kayaking organizations